Firlej  is a village in Lubartów County, Lublin Voivodeship, in eastern Poland. It is the seat of the gmina (administrative district) called Gmina Firlej. It is situated close to Lake Firlej

In 2004 the village had a population of 1,000.

History
The town Firlej was founded by Mikołaj Firlej in 1557. From the beginning the town has typical agriculture and handicraft character.

The other owners of Firlej were the families of Zalewski, Lubomirski and Sanguszko. In 1839 the town belonged to the president of Bank Polski - Mr Henryk Łubieński, who grounded the first factory of tools and agriculture machines in Lublin area.

Firlej took part also in uprising fights in 1831 and in 1863. The town had lost his rights because of patriotism of its citizens in 1869. Battles during World War I brought heavy damage to the town. In the first half of August 1920 in Firlej, marshal Józef Piłsudski inspected the Polish troops going to the east.

World War II
During German Nazi occupation Firlej was an area of activity of A.K. division of captain T. Pośpiech. The town was liberated on July, 22. 1944 by the 27 Wołyń Division of Armia Krajowa.

Agrotourism
The lack of large cities and industry in the area makes development of agrotourism and ecological farm very attractive. The picturesque rivers Wieprz and Tyśmienica, with numerous old basins, make this flat area attractive for recreation, especially water sports. For angling fans there are different sweet water fish like: perch, pike, eel, tench and others.

References

External links
 Rootsweb.com

Firlej
Lublin Governorate